The Journal of Applied Developmental Psychology provides a forum for the presentation of conceptual, methodological, policy, and research studies involved in the application of behavioral science research in developmental and life span psychology. The Journal publishes papers from an interdisciplinary perspective focusing on a broad array of social issues ranging from conception to old age.

References

External links
Journal of Applied Developmental Psychology

Citations 
 Journal of Applied Developmental Psychology. Journal of Applied Developmental Psychology | ScienceDirect.com by Elsevier. (n.d.). https://www.sciencedirect.com/journal/journal-of-applied-developmental-psychology.

Developmental psychology journals
Elsevier academic journals
Applied psychology journals